Mikkel Adrup Poulsen (born 17 October 1984 in Hvidovre) is an internationally elite curler from Denmark.

He made his world championship debut at the 2008 World Championships in Grand Forks, North Dakota, U.S. He also competed at the 2009 Moncton World Championships. Both times Mikkel Poulsen served as the Alternate for Team Denmark.

The team has qualified for the 2010 Winter Olympics where Poulsen will again fill the Alternate position for the Danish team.

Teammates 
2010 Vancouver Olympic Games

Johnny Frederiksen, Fourth

Ulrik Schmidt, Third

Bo Jensen, Second

Lars Vilandt, Lead

References

External links
 

Living people
Olympic curlers of Denmark
Curlers at the 2010 Winter Olympics
Curlers at the 2014 Winter Olympics
Curlers at the 2018 Winter Olympics
Danish male curlers
1984 births
People from Hvidovre Municipality
Sportspeople from the Capital Region of Denmark
21st-century Danish people